The 2017–18 season was PAOK Football Club's 92st in existence and the club's 59th consecutive season in the top flight of Greek football. The season was marked by two derby matches (vs Olympiacos on 25 February and vs AEK on 11 March) that were awarded against PAOK by court decision. The team defended their Greek Cup title won in 2017 and also competed in UEFA Europa League.

Coaching staff

Other information

|-

Players

Squad information

Players in

|}
Total spending:  €6.40M

Players out

Pre-season

Competitions

Overview

Managerial statistics

Super League

League table

Results summary

Note: PAOK were deducted 3 points by court decision.

Results by round

Matches

Greek Cup

Group stage

Round of 16

Quarter-finals

Semi-finals

Final

UEFA Europa League

Third qualifying round

Play-off round

Statistics

Squad statistics

! colspan="13" style="background:#DCDCDC; text-align:center" | Goalkeepers
|-

! colspan="13" style="background:#DCDCDC; text-align:center" | Defenders
|-

! colspan="13" style="background:#DCDCDC; text-align:center" | Midfielders
|-

! colspan="13" style="background:#DCDCDC; text-align:center" | Forwards
|-

! colspan="13" style="background:#DCDCDC; text-align:center" | Players transferred out during the season
|-

|}

Goalscorers
'Match played 12 May 2018.'

Clean sheets
Last updated on 6 May 2018.

Disciplinary record

References

External links
 PAOK FC official website

PAOK FC seasons
PAOK
PAOK FC